was a village located in Abashiri District, Abashiri Subprefecture (now Okhotsk Subprefecture), Hokkaido, Japan.  It was split off from Abashiri Town (now Abashiri City) in 1947.

As of 2004, the village has an estimated population of 2,745 and a density of 14.89 persons per km2. The total area is 184.38 km2.

On March 31, 2006, Higashimokoto was merged with the town of Memanbetsu (also from Abashiri District) to create the new town of Ōzora.

External links
 Ōzora official website 

Dissolved municipalities of Hokkaido
Populated places established in 1947
Populated places disestablished in 2006
1947 establishments in Japan
2006 disestablishments in Japan